Mete Avni Sözen (22 May 1930 – 5 April 2018) was Kettelhut Distinguished Professor of Structural Engineering at Purdue University, Indiana, United States from 1992 to 2018.

Academic career
Sozen earned his undergraduate education at the Engineering School of Robert College in Istanbul (1951), and his master's (1952) and doctoral degrees (1957) from the University of Illinois at Urbana–Champaign.   He earned his Ph.D. under the direction of Chester P. Siess and Nathan M. Newmark performing experimental studies to develop theories governing the shear strength of prestressed concrete girders. He then began his academic career at University of Illinois at Urbana–Champaign where he served on the faculty from 1957 through 1992.

The following students completed their Ph.D. dissertation under the direction of Mete Sozen:

Earthquake engineering
With funding from the National Science Foundation and technical support from MTS Systems Corporation Sozen, Shunsuke Otani, Polat Gulkan, and Norbert Nielsen developed the first earthquake shaking simulators in the United States in 1967, which was housed at University of Illinois.

Other contributions
Besides his academic interest in the development of design codes for concrete structures, Sozen was notable for his contributions to the official post 9/11–government studies of terrorist attacks, including the Oklahoma City bombing, and The Pentagon. Sozen also led a team that created an engineering simulation of American Airlines Flight 11 crashing into the North Tower of the World Trade Center. The computer–animated visualizations were made entirely from the simulation data.

In 1977, he was elected to the National Academy of Engineering.

References

External links
 https://engineering.purdue.edu/CE/AboutUs/News/Structures_Features/mete-a-sozen-a-collection-of-personal-remembrances

1930 births
2018 deaths
Structural engineers
Engineering academics
Engineers from Istanbul
Members of the United States National Academy of Engineering
Purdue University faculty
Robert College alumni
Turkish emigrants to the United States
Grainger College of Engineering alumni
University of Illinois Urbana-Champaign faculty